Ryosuke Kinoshita (born 16 July 1991) is a Japanese professional golfer. He has played primarily on the Japan Golf Tour since 2014 and has won twice on the tour.

Professional career 
Kinoshita turned professional in late 2013. From 2014 to 2018, he played on the Japan Golf Tour and the second-tier Japan Challenge Tour. In his first season, 2014, he was a joint runner-up in the Dunlop Srixon Fukushima Open, two strokes behind Satoshi Kodaira. In 2018, he won the ISPS Handa Challenge Cup on the Japan Challenge Tour, by two strokes. In 2018, he also had his first top-10 finishes on the main Japan Golf Tour since 2014, including a tie for fourth place in the Fujisankei Classic.

In early 2020, Kinoshita finished tied for 6th place in the SMBC Singapore Open. The event was one of the Open Qualifying Series for the Open Championship and his high finish gave him entry to the 2020 Open Championship. The 2020 Open was later cancelled but Kinoshita was given an entry into the 2021 Open Championship, his first major championship. In late 2020, Kinoshita was runner-up in the Mitsui Sumitomo Visa Taiheiyo Masters, a stroke behind Jinichiro Kozuma, who had an eagle at the final hole while Kinoshita could only make a par.

Kinoshita had his first win on the Japan Golf Tour at the Japan Golf Tour Championship Mori Building Cup Shishido Hills, winning by 5 strokes from Yuki Furuwaka. Three weeks later, he won again on the tour, at the Dunlop Srixon Fukushima Open. He had a final round 62, to get into a playoff with Ryuko Tokimatsu, and won with a birdie at the first extra hole.

At the 2021 Open Championship, Kinoshita placed 59th. This was after making a par putt on the 18th on Friday's second round to make the cut line.

Professional wins (3)

Japan Golf Tour wins (2)

Japan Golf Tour playoff record (1–0)

Japan Challenge Tour wins (1)

Results in major championships

CUT = missed the half-way cut
"T" = tied

Results in World Golf Championships

1Cancelled due to COVID-19 pandemic

"T" = Tied
NT = No tournament

References

External links 

Japanese male golfers
Japan Golf Tour golfers
LIV Golf players
Sportspeople from Nara Prefecture
1991 births
Living people